The Great Attractor is a purported gravitational attraction in intergalactic space and the apparent central gravitational point of the Laniakea Supercluster. This supercluster contains our own galaxy, the Milky Way, as well as about 100,000 other galaxies.

The observed attraction suggests a localized concentration of mass millions of times more massive than the Milky Way. However, it is inconveniently obscured by our own Milky Way's galactic plane, lying behind the Zone of Avoidance (ZOA), so that in visible light wavelengths, the Great Attractor is difficult to observe directly. 

The attraction is observable by its effect on the motion of galaxies and their associated clusters over a region of hundreds of millions of light-years across the universe. These galaxies are observable above and below the ZOA; all are redshifted in accordance with the Hubble flow, indicating that they are receding relative to us and to each other, but the variations in their redshifts are large enough and regular enough to reveal that they are slightly drawn towards the attraction. The variations in their redshifts are known as peculiar velocities, and cover a range from about +700 km/s to −700 km/s, depending on the angular deviation from the direction to the Great Attractor.

The Great Attractor itself is moving towards the Shapley Supercluster. Recent astronomical studies by a team of South African astrophysicists revealed a supercluster of galaxies, termed the Vela Supercluster, in the Great Attractor's theorized location.

Discovery 
It was first discovered in the 1970s that the Milky Way moves through space. Through a series of peculiar velocity tests, astrophysicists found that the Milky Way was moving in the direction of the constellation of Centaurus at about 600km/s. Then, the discovery of cosmic microwave background (CMB) dipoles were used to reflect the motion of the Local Group of galaxies towards the Great Attractor. The 1980s brought many discoveries about the Great Attractor such as the fact that the Milky Way is not the only galaxy impacted and an approximation of 400 elliptical galaxies are moving toward the Great Attractor beyond the ZOA.

Location
The first indications of a deviation from uniform expansion of the universe were reported in 1973 and again in 1978. The location of the Great Attractor was finally determined in 1986: It is situated at a distance of somewhere between 150 and 250 Mly (million light-years) (47–79 Mpc) (the larger being the most recent estimate) away from the Milky Way, in the direction of the constellations Triangulum Australe (The Southern Triangle) and Norma (The Carpenter's Square). While objects in that direction lie in the Zone of Avoidance (the part of the night sky obscured by the Milky Way galaxy) and are thus difficult to study with visible wavelengths, X-ray observations have revealed that region of space to be dominated by the Norma Cluster (ACO 3627), a massive cluster of galaxies containing a preponderance of large, old galaxies, many of which are colliding with their neighbours and radiating large amounts of radio waves.

Debate over apparent mass
In 1992 much of the apparent signal of the Great Attractor was attributed to a statistical effect called Malmquist bias. In 2005, astronomers conducting an X-ray survey of part of the sky known as the Clusters in the Zone of Avoidance (CIZA) project reported that the Great Attractor was actually only one tenth the mass that scientists had originally estimated. The survey also confirmed earlier theories that the Milky Way galaxy is in fact being pulled toward a much more massive cluster of galaxies near the Shapley Supercluster, which lies beyond the Great Attractor, and which is called the Shapley Attractor.

Dark flow 

Because the expansion of the universe is credited to dark energy, it has been thought that only something equally as dark could have the power to overcome it. Thus, instead of a massive supercluster being responsible, it is a mysterious undiscovered force called dark flow. The concept of dark flow, however, proves controversial as the distribution of matter in the observed universe cannot account for it.

Laniakea Supercluster

The proposed Laniakea Supercluster is defined as the Great Attractor's basin. It covers approximately four main galaxy superclusters, including former superclusters of Virgo and Hydra-Centaurus, and spans across 500 million light years. Because it is not dense enough to be gravitationally bound, it should be dispersing as the universe expands, but it is instead anchored by a gravitational focal point. Thus the Great Attractor would be the core of the new supercluster.

Vela Supercluster

In 2016, a multinational team of South African, European and Australian researchers headed by South African astronomer Renée C. Kraan-Korteweg announced the discovery of the Vela Supercluster in the region of the Great Attractor that would largely explain the mystery of the latter's gravitational pull. Using data from the AAOmega spectrograph, the 3.9 m Anglo-Australian Telescope, and the Southern African Large Telescope, astronomers detected a region of galactic overdensity consistent with the "supercluster" designation, which provides the requisite explanation for a gravitational attraction in the Shapley Supercluster neighborhood where the Great Attractor was theorized to be located.

See also

References

Further reading

External links
 
  – video clip showing the Great Attractor
 The clickable Norma Cluster

 
Shapley Supercluster
Virgo Supercluster
Norma Cluster
Large-scale structure of the cosmos
Astronomical objects discovered in 1986